Blow Out is a 1981 American neo-noir mystery thriller film written and directed by Brian De Palma. The film stars John Travolta as Jack Terry, a movie sound effects technician from Philadelphia who, while recording sounds for a low-budget slasher film, serendipitously captures audio evidence of an assassination involving a presidential hopeful. Nancy Allen stars as Sally Bedina, a young woman involved in the crime. The supporting cast includes John Lithgow and Dennis Franz. The film's tagline in advertisements was, "Murder has a sound all of its own".

Directly based on Michelangelo Antonioni's 1966 film Blowup, the film replaces the medium of photography with the medium of audio recording. The concept of Blow Out came to De Palma while he was working on the thriller Dressed to Kill (1980). The film was shot in the late autumn and winter of 1980 in various Philadelphia locations on a relatively substantial budget of $18 million.

Blow Out opened to minuscule audience interest at the time of release despite receiving a mostly positive critical reception. The lead performances by Travolta and Allen, the direction by De Palma and the visual style were cited as the strongest points of the film. Critics also recognised the stylistic and narrative connection to the work of Alfred Hitchcock, whom De Palma admires, and giallo films. Over the years since its initial theatrical release, it has developed status as a cult film and received a home media release by the Criterion Collection, a company which specializes in "important classic and contemporary film", which re-ignited public interest in the film. Quentin Tarantino praises De Palma as the "greatest director of his generation" and cites Blow Out as  one of his three favorite films that he would take to a desert island.

Plot
While in post-production on the low-budget slasher film Co-ed Frenzy, Philadelphia sound technician Jack Terry (Travolta) is told by his producer Sam to obtain a more realistic-sounding scream and better wind effects. While recording potential sound effects at a local park, he sees a car careen off the road and plunge into a nearby creek. The male driver is killed, but Jack manages to rescue a young woman named Sally Bedina (Allen) and accompanies her to a hospital. There, a detective interviews Jack about the accident, and Jack asks Sally out for a drink. He learns that Governor George McRyan was driving the car and that Sally was his escort. Associates of McRyan attempt to conceal Sally's involvement, and persuade Jack to smuggle her out of the hospital.

Jack listens to the audio tape he recorded of the accident, wherein he distinctly hears a gunshot just before the tire blow-out that caused the accident, suspecting that the accident was actually an assassination. He learns from a news report that, seemingly coincidentally, Manny Karp (Franz) was also in the park that night and filmed the accident with a motion picture camera. When Karp sells stills from his film to a local tabloid, Jack splices them together into a crude movie, syncs them with his recorded audio and finds a visible flash and smoke from the fired gun. Though initially reluctant, Sally eventually agrees to cooperate with Jack to privately investigate the incident. When they go out for a drink, Jack reveals how he left his prior career as part of a government commission to root out police corruption after a wiretap operation he was involved in led to the death of an undercover cop named Freddie Corso.

Unbeknownst to Jack, Sally and Karp were both frequent blackmail co-conspirators who were hired as part of a larger plot against presidential hopeful McRyan. A rival candidate had hired Burke (Lithgow) to hook McRyan with a prostitute, take unflattering pictures of the pair, and publish them so that McRyan would drop out of the race. However, Burke decided to alter the plan by blowing out the tire of McRyan's car with a gunshot, thereby causing the accident. When the authorities arrived to find McRyan with Sally, Karp would be there to film it all. After botching the cover-up of Sally by murdering a look-alike, Burke murders two more look-alike women with piano wire and attributes the deaths to a serial killer, "the Liberty Bell Strangler", so that he can cover up the cover-up when Sally is successfully murdered.

To help Jack investigate McRyan's murder, Sally steals Karp's film, which, when synced to Jack's audio, clearly reveals the gunshot that precipitated the blow-out. Nevertheless, nobody believes Jack's story and a seemingly widespread conspiracy immediately silences his every move. Local talk-show host Frank Donahue (Curt May) asks to interview Jack on air and release his tapes, to which Jack eventually agrees. Burke follows the development through a tap on Jack's phone, calls Sally as Donahue, and asks her to meet him at a train station with the tapes. When Sally tells Jack about Donahue's call, he becomes suspicious. He copies the audio tapes, but is unable to copy the film before Sally's meeting.

Shadowing a wired Sally from a distance, Jack is alarmed to see that his supposed contact is actually Burke. Immediately realizing that she is in danger, Jack attempts to warn her, but Sally and Burke slip out of range and into a parade. Jack manically dashes across the city, attempting to head them off and rescue Sally, but crashes his Jeep and is knocked out. By the time he awakens, Burke has gotten the film from Sally and thrown it into a river. He then takes Sally to a rooftop and attacks her. Still listening in on his earpiece, Jack spots them. He startles Burke and manages to stab him to death with his own weapon, but it is too late: he has already strangled Sally. A devastated Jack takes her lifeless body in his arms.

Burke's death, combined with the loss of the film, ties up the last loose end. Jack's audio tapes alone are insufficient to prove a gunshot and the cover-up is successful. Jack begins repeatedly listening to the recording of Sally's voice, becoming obsessed with it. In the last scene, he is back in the editing room and has used Sally's death scream in the slasher film. Ecstatic that Jack found the perfect scream, Sam plays it multiple times, forcing Jack to cover his ears.

Cast
John Travolta as Jack Terry
Nancy Allen as Sally Bedina
John Lithgow as Burke
Dennis Franz as Manny Karp
Peter Boyden as Sam
Curt May as Frank Donahue
John Aquino as Detective Mackey
John McMartin as Lawrence Henry
Robin Sherwood as Betty
Michael Tearson as Hawker

Production
After completing Dressed to Kill, De Palma was considering several projects, including Act of Vengeance (later produced for HBO starring Charles Bronson and Ellen Burstyn), Flashdance, and a script of his own titled Personal Effects. The story outline for the latter was similar to what would become Blow Out, but set in Canada.

De Palma scripted and filmed Blow Out in his home town of Philadelphia. The film's $9 million budget was high for De Palma, and Filmways spent an additional $9 million to market the film. De Palma considered Al Pacino for the role of Jack Terry, but ultimately chose John Travolta, who himself lobbied De Palma to cast Nancy Allen for the role of Sally Bedina (the three had previously worked together on Carrie); De Palma initially hesitated—he was married to Allen at the time, and did not want her to be known for only working in his pictures—but ultimately agreed. In addition to Travolta and Allen, De Palma filled the film's cast and crew with a number of his frequent collaborators: Dennis Franz (Dressed to Kill, The Fury, Body Double); John Lithgow (Obsession, Raising Cain in later years); cinematographer Vilmos Zsigmond (Obsession); editor Paul Hirsch (Hi, Mom!, Sisters, Phantom of the Paradise, Obsession, Carrie, The Fury); and composer Pino Donaggio (Carrie, Home Movies, Dressed to Kill).

Seventy percent of the film was shot at night. "Basically I just shot Blow Out straight", replied cinematographer Vilmos Zsigmond, "... By not diffusing and not flashing as much ... That doesn't mean I necessarily like that look but I think it was good for the picture. You see, I like a softer look, a more diffused look." During the editing process, two reels of footage from the Liberty Parade sequence were stolen and never recovered. The scenes were reshot with insurance money at a cost of $750,000. Because Zsigmond was no longer available, László Kovács lensed the reshot sequences.

Themes and allusions
Thematically, Blow Out almost "exclusively concern[s] the mechanics of movie making" with a "total, complete and utter preoccupation with film itself as a medium in which ... style really is content." In numerous scenes, the film depicts the interaction of sound and images, the manner in which the two are joined together, and methods in which they are re-edited, remixed, and rearranged to reveal new truths or the lack of any objective truth. The film uses several of De Palma's trademark techniques: split screen, the split diopter lens, and the elaborate tracking shot.

As with several other De Palma films, Blow Out explores the power of guilt; both Jack and Sally are motivated to help right their past wrongs, both with tragic consequences. De Palma also revisits the theme of voyeurism, a recurring theme in much of his previous work (ex:, Hi, Mom!, Sisters, and Dressed to Kill). Jack exhibits elements of a peeping tom, but one who works with sound instead of image.

Blow Out incorporates multiple allusions both to other films and to historical events. Its protagonist's obsessive reconstruction of a sound recording to uncover a possible murder recalls both Michelangelo Antonioni's film Blowup and Francis Ford Coppola's The Conversation. The film alludes to elements of the Watergate scandal and the JFK assassination. The film also recalls elements of the Chappaquiddick incident, although De Palma intentionally tried to downplay the similarities. The film intentionally references the Zapruder film as comparable to the footage shot of the accident (despite the latter being consisted of stills).

De Palma also explicitly references two of his previous projects. At one point in the film, Dennis Franz watches De Palma's film Murder a la Mod on television. Originally, the character was to watch Coppola's Dementia 13, but Roger Corman demanded too much for the rights. A flashback where Travolta recalls an incident where his work got a police informant killed was also taken from an abandoned project, Prince of the City, which was ultimately directed by Sidney Lumet.

Reception
Blow Out opened on July 24, 1981 to positive reviews from critics, including several that were ecstatic. In The New Yorker, Pauline Kael gave the film one of her few unconditional raves:

De Palma has sprung to the place that Robert Altman achieved with films such as McCabe & Mrs. Miller and Nashville and that Francis Ford Coppola reached with The Godfather films—that is, to the place where genre is transcended and what we're moved by is an artist's vision...it's a great movie. Travolta and Allen are radiant performers.

Roger Ebert's four-star review in the Chicago Sun-Times noted that Blow Out "is inhabited by a real cinematic intelligence. The audience isn't condescended to...we share the excitement of figuring out how things develop and unfold, when so often the movies only need us as passive witnesses." Review aggregator website Rotten Tomatoes gives the film a rating of 87% based on 60 reviews, with an average grade of 7.80/10. The critical consensus reads, "With a story inspired by Antonioni's Blowup and a style informed by the high-gloss suspense of Hitchcock, De Palma's Blow Out is raw, politically informed, and littered with film references".

Despite positive reviews, the film floundered at the box office, due to terrible word of mouth about its bleak ending. Blow Out made $13,747,234 (or $ in ) at the box office. It was considered a disappointment, as Filmways had publicly claimed the film would make $60–80 million.

However, the public reputation of Blow Out has grown considerably in the years following its release. As a "movie about making movies", it has earned a natural audience with subsequent generations of cineastes.  In particular, Quentin Tarantino has consistently praised the movie, listing it alongside Rio Bravo and Taxi Driver as one of his three favorite films. In homage, Tarantino used the music cue "Sally and Jack" from the score by Pino Donaggio score within his own film Death Proof, the second half of the double release Grindhouse. Noel Murray and Scott Tobias of The AV Club put Blow Out at #1 of their list of De Palma's best films ("The Essentials"), describing it as

The quintessential De Palma film, this study of a movie craftsman investigating a political cover-up marries suspense, sick humor, sexuality, and leftist cynicism into an endlessly reflective study of art imitating life imitating art.

In April 2011, the film became a part of the Criterion Collection with a DVD and Blu-ray release. Extras include new interviews with Brian De Palma and Nancy Allen. The Criterion release also includes De Palma's first feature-length film Murder a la Mod.

The film was given a widespread release internationally; first in the Netherlands on September 24, 1981 and then in Australia on January 14, 1982, Hong Kong on February 11, France on February 17, and Japan on March 20.

Accolades

In popular culture
In the 2019 film Joker, the film title appears in the list of two movies being played in the movie theater that the Wayne family is leaving, together with Zorro, The Gay Blade.

See also

 1981 in film
 Audio surveillance
 Giallo
 The Conversation, 1974 film similar in content
 List of American films of 1981
 List of horror films of 1981
 List of films featuring surveillance

Explanatory notes

References

External links

 
 
 
 
 Criterion Collection Essay by Michael Sragow
 1981 review of the film by Pauline Kael
 Blow Out: American Scream an essay by Michael Sragow at the Criterion Collection

1980s crime thriller films
1980s mystery thriller films
1980s political thriller films
1980s psychological thriller films
1981 films
1981 independent films
American crime thriller films
American detective films
American independent films
American mystery thriller films
American neo-noir films
American political thriller films
American psychological thriller films
Fictional portrayals of the Philadelphia Police Department
Films about conspiracy theories
Films about contract killing
Films about filmmaking
Films about security and surveillance
Films about whistleblowing
Films à clef
Films directed by Brian De Palma
Films scored by Pino Donaggio
Films set in Pennsylvania
Films set in Philadelphia
Films shot in Philadelphia
Filmways films
Films about hoaxes
Techno-thriller films
Films set in a movie theatre
1980s English-language films
1980s American films